Elvstroem (foaled 14 November 2000 in Australia) was a bay Thoroughbred racehorse, by world champion sire Danehill from the former champion three-year-old filly, Circles of Gold.

Dam
Circles of Gold, is a 1991 chestnut mare by the Australasian Champion Sire and Broodmare sire Marscay. She was bred at Widden Stud, where her sire used to stand.  Circles of Gold was purchased by McDonald's Licensees - Frank Tagg, Frank Meduri and Gary Moffitt at the sales and raced in their famous gold/white and red colours.

Circles of Gold faced the starter on 43 occasions, winning 6 and placing in a further a 13 races.  Her most notable victory was the 1995 AJC Oaks, she also placed in the Group 1 Caulfield Cup of 1996 to the now deceased filly Arctic Scent, a race her son would capture in 2004. She was a winner of over $900,000 in stakes.

Her other progeny include Gold Rush, Lady Circles, Hveger, and Haradasun, winner of the 2007 Group 1 George Ryder Stakes and the Group 1 Doncaster Handicap.

Circles of Gold died at Segenhoe Stud aged 25 on 9 November 2016.

At the sales
Elvstroem sold for A$300,000.00 at the Inglis Sales of 2002 to leading South Coast trainer Bede Murray (most notable horses include Universal Prince and Victory Rein), however the sale fell through and he was returned to his breeders, McDonald's Licensees Frank Tagg, Frank Meduri and Gary Moffitt.  Little did they realise that their Danehill colt would become one of Australia's best racehorses post 2000.

Racing career
Elvstroem was trained by Tony Vasil at Caulfield.  He raced 32 times, winning 10 races and placing on 9 other occasions.  His most notable victory came way in the 2004 Caulfield Cup where he beat the champion racemare Makybe Diva by a nose.  Although he didn't win, his 4th in the Melbourne Cup on a track rated heavy is considered one of his best, due to him not being considered a chance of running. 
His other major wins came way in the Group 1 VRC Derby of 2003, Group 1 MRC Underwood Stakes, Group 1 MRC C F Orr Stakes in 2005 and Group 1 Dubai Duty Free Stakes at Nad Al Sheba Racecourse in Dubai, held in 2005.

He won $5,722,274 in stakes, and won from distances of 1300 metres (6½ furlongs) up to 2,500 metres (12½ furlongs). In races in which both he and Makybe Diva participated, he finished ahead of her the majority of the time.

Race record

At stud
In 2005, Elvstroem retired to stud at Victoria's famed Blue Gum Stud Farm.  The stud had been looking for a replacement after losing Encosta De Lago to Coolmore Stud the previous season. Blue Gum Stud has stood the stallions, Rubiton (now deceased), Noalcoholic, Rancho Ruler and the consistent sire Umatilla.

In 2005 Elvstroem covered 166 mares, at A$38,500.00 per mare. His bookings included stakes producing mare Add Tinsel (dam of Caulfield Cup placegetter/stakes winner Celestial Show & Fashion Victim), stakes winner British Lion, Group 2 winner Climb The Vine, stakes producing mare Dangerous Seam (dam of Real Jester & Seidnazar), stakes producing mare Gabbing Glora (dam of Caulfield Cup Australasian record holder Diatribe), stakes producing mare Lottey (dam of Gold Lottey), Group 3 winner Sunny Lane, Group 2 winner Tickle My, etc.

He is the sire of Carrara, winner of the 2009 BTC Doomben Slipper.

Pedigree

See also
List of millionaire racehorses in Australia

References

 Elvstroem's pedigree and racing stats

External links
 

2000 racehorse births
Victoria Derby winners
Racehorses bred in Australia
Racehorses trained in Australia
Thoroughbred family 22-b
Caulfield Cup winners